There are many different types of shopping centres In Australia. In 2018, the Shopping Centre Council of Australia Identified Australia had 1,630 existing shopping centres, being defined as a major Integrated retail centre with at least  of lettable retail floor-space, with over 65,000 specialty shops. Of the 1,630 shopping centres, 78 are defined as regional centres, 96 as central business district centres, 291 as sub-regional centres (being those that include at least one discount department store as the major anchor tenant) and 1,120 Neighbourhood or supermarket-based shopping centres. The remaining centres are smaller sub-regional centres, neighbourhood centres or speciality shops with typically less than  gross leasable area.

List by gross leasable area

List by number of stores 
The number of stores recorded in this list is approximate only, and subject to regular change.

See also 
 List of shopping centres in Australia
 List of Westfield Group shopping centres in Australia

References 

Shopping centres, largest
Australia
Shopping centres